David Mark Basa is a Filipino footballer who currently plays for Maharlika Manila in the Philippines Football League.

Career
Basa began playing football in high school at the Colegio de San Juan de Letran. He continued playing in college, becoming captain of the University of Santo Tomas team.

International
Basa has trained with the Philippines national football team repeatedly and was selected for the 2010 AFF Suzuki Cup.  He played in a 2010 AFF Suzuki Cup qualifying match against Cambodia in October 2010.

Basa has also participated with the Philippines national under-23 football team.

References

External links
  United Football League
 

1989 births
Living people
Association football midfielders
Filipino footballers
Philippines international footballers
Global Makati F.C. players
University Athletic Association of the Philippines footballers
Stallion Laguna F.C. players
University of Santo Tomas alumni
JPV Marikina F.C. players